Lyudmila Vladimirovna Khrushcheva (born 30 December 1955) is a Russian racewalker. As a senior, she won two medals at the 1981 World Cup and held world records in the 5 km and 10 km events. She later won five world titles in the masters category.

References

1955 births
Living people
Russian female racewalkers
Soviet female racewalkers